Callipteridium is an extinct genus of pteridospermous seed ferns belonging to the family Cyclopteridaceae. These ferns existed in the Carboniferous period.

References

 Georges Basement
 Gilbert A. Leisman The Morphology and Anatomy of Callipteridium Sullivanti American Journal of Botany - Vol. 47, No. 4 (Apr., 1960), pp. 281–287

Pteridospermatophyta
Carboniferous plants
Prehistoric plant genera
Carboniferous first appearances
Carboniferous extinctions
Fossils of Georgia (U.S. state)
Paleozoic life of Prince Edward Island